Ogden High School is a school in Ogden, Utah.

Ogden High School may also refer to:

 The high school division of Ogden International School in Chicago
 Ogden High School in Ogden, Iowa
 St. Joseph-Ogden High School in St. Joseph, Illinois